Comic Shop News (also called CSN) is a weekly newspaper distributed by comic book specialty stores. It was launched in 1987 by Cliff Biggers and Ward Batty, both of whom have continued to edit it.

History 
In 1982, Biggers and Batty became co-owners of a Marietta, Georgia, comic shop, Dr. No's, for which Biggers began writing a newsletter, The Doctor Knows. Realizing there was a market for an upbeat, product-focused store newsletter, they started Comic Shop News. At the time, DC, Marvel and other publishers were selling their own newsletters in bundles to comic shops. Using that distribution technique, CSN is sold in bundles to comic shops who distribute free to customers as a sales tool and to reward weekly visits.

CSN grew to become the largest-circulation weekly in the comic book industry, and still continues as a weekly publication with over 1,800 issues published to date and over 130 million copies sold. CSN is available in over 400 comic shops worldwide, but mostly in North America. CSN was originally four black-and-white pages but expanded to eight pages and full color.

While CSN is primarily a news source, some original comics content has also been featured. In addition to Batman, Teenage Mutant Ninja Turtles and the currently-running Spider-Man newspaper strips, Brian Michael Bendis and artist Michael Avon Oeming long-running comic,  Powers was initially previewed in a series of original strips. The eight strips were colored and lettered by Bendis (before initial colorist/letterer Pat Garrahy became involved) and complemented the upcoming series as a companion piece in newspaper strip form. The strips were collected in the Powers: The Definitive Hardcover Collection vol. 1.

A mock version of Comic Shop News was featured in the opening credits of the film Chasing Amy.

See also 
 Direct market

External links
 

1987 establishments in Georgia (U.S. state)
English-language magazines
Magazines about comics
Magazines established in 1987
Magazines published in Georgia (U.S. state)
Weekly magazines published in the United States